The 2020 Menards 200 presented by Crosley Brands was the 10th race of the 2020 ARCA Menards Series season, the fifth race of the 2020 Sioux Chief Showdown, and the second of two back-to-back races of the weekend. The race was held on Saturday, August 1, in Toledo, Ohio, at Toledo Speedway, a 0.5 miles (0.80 km) permanent oval-shaped racetrack. The race was shortened from the scheduled 200 laps to 127 due to rain. At race's end, Sam Mayer of GMS Racing would sweep the weekend, taking the lead on a late restart on lap 117 to win his second career ARCA Menards Series win and his second of the season and his second consecutive win of the season. To fill out the podium, Chandler Smith of Venturini Motorsports and Bret Holmes of Bret Holmes Racing would finish second and third, respectively.

Background 
Toledo Speedway opened in 1960 and was paved in 1964. In 1978 it was sold to Thomas "Sonny" Adams Sr. The speedway was reacquired by ARCA in 1999. The track also features the weekly racing divisions of sportsman on the half-mile and Figure 8, factory stock, and four cylinders on a quarter-mile track inside the big track. They also have a series of races with outlaw-bodied late models that includes four 100-lap races and ends with Glass City 200. The track hosts the “Fastest short track show in the world” which features winged sprints and winged Super Modifieds on the half mile. Toledo also used to host a 200-lap late model race until its sale to ARCA in 1999.

Toledo is known for the foam blocks that line the race track, different than the concrete walls that line many short tracks throughout America. The crumbling walls can make track cleanup a tedious task for workers.

Entry list

Qualifying 
Qualifying was held on Friday, July 31, at 6:30 PM EST. Qualifying was a single car, two lap system where the first lap would determine the starting the starting position for Friday's race, and the second lap would determine the starting the starting position for Saturday's race.

Race results

References 

2020 ARCA Menards Series
August 2020 sports events in the United States
2020 in sports in Ohio